This is a list of Wait Wait... Don't Tell Me! guests for 2008. Data is taken from the Wait Wait... Don't Tell Me! Archives. Job titles reflect the position of individuals at the time of the appearance.


January

February

March

April

May

June

July

August

September

October

November

December

Wait Wait... Don't Tell Me!
Wait Wait Don't Tell Me
Wait Wait Don't Tell Me